Jensen Farley Pictures was an American independent film distribution company based in Utah that released several films between 1980 and 1983, founded by Raylan Jensen and Clair Farley, former heads of Sunn Classic Pictures. The company filed for Chapter 11 bankruptcy on December 30, 1983, and ceased distribution.

Films distributed

See also 
 Sunn Classic Pictures

References 

1980 establishments in Utah
1983 disestablishments in Utah
Film distributors of the United States
Companies that filed for Chapter 11 bankruptcy in 1983
Defunct film and television production companies of the United States